Shorea coriacea is a tree in the family Dipterocarpaceae, native to Borneo. The specific epithet coriacea means "leathery" and refers to the leaves.

Description
The dark brown bark is flaky and fissured.

Distribution and habitat
Shorea coriacea is endemic to Borneo.

Conservation
Shorea coriacea has been assessed as near threatened on the IUCN Red List. It is threatened by agriculture, mining, road and village development and by logging for its timber. However, the species does occur in a number of protected areas in Sabah and Sarawak.

References

coriacea
Endemic flora of Borneo
Plants described in 1887
Taxa named by William Burck